In current military parlance, a strike fighter is a multirole combat aircraft designed to operate both as an attack aircraft and as an air superiority fighter. As a category, it is distinct from fighter-bombers. It is closely related to the concept of interdictor aircraft, but it puts more emphasis on aerial combat capabilities as a multirole combat aircraft. Examples of contemporary American strike fighters are the McDonnell Douglas F-15E Strike Eagle, Boeing F/A-18E/F Super Hornet, and Lockheed Martin F-35 Lightning II.

History
Beginning in the 1940s, the term "strike fighter" was occasionally used in navies to refer to fighter aircraft capable of performing air-to-surface strikes, such as the Westland Wyvern,<ref>"Aerospace Engineering, Volume 6." Institute of the Aerospace Sciences, 1947.</ref> Blackburn Firebrand and Blackburn Firecrest.

The term "light weight tactical strike fighter (LWTSF)" was used to describe the aircraft to meet the December 1953 NATO specification NBMR-1. Amongst the designs submitted to the competition were the Aerfer Sagittario 2, Breguet Br.1001 Taon, Dassault Étendard VI, Fiat G.91 and Sud-Est Baroudeur.

The term entered normal use in the United States Navy by the end of the 1970s, becoming the official description of the new McDonnell Douglas F/A-18 Hornet. In 1983, the U.S. Navy even renamed each existing Fighter Attack Squadron to Strike Fighter Squadron to emphasize the air-to-surface mission (as the "Fighter Attack" designation was confused with the "Fighter" designation, which flew pure air-to-air missions).

This name quickly spread to non-maritime use. When the F-15E Strike Eagle came into service, it was originally called a "dual role fighter", but it instead quickly became known as a "strike fighter".

Joint Strike Fighter

In 1995, the U.S. military's Joint Advanced Strike Technology program changed its name to the Joint Strike Fighter program. The project consequently resulted in the development of the F-35 Lightning II family of fifth generation multirole fighters to perform ground attack, reconnaissance, and air defense missions with stealth capability.

 Modern strike fighters 
 McDonnell Douglas F-15E Strike Eagle
 Boeing F/A-18E/F Super Hornet
 Lockheed Martin F-35 Lightning II
 Sukhoi Su-30MKK
 Sukhoi Su-34
Shenyang J-16

See also
Interdictor aircraft
Interceptor aircraft
Fighter-bomber
Attack aircraft
Multirole combat aircraft

References

Citations

Bibliography

 Polmar, Norman. The Naval Institute Guide to the Ships and Aircraft of the U.S. Fleet.'' Annapolis, Maryland: Naval Institute Press, 1997. .

Fighter aircraft
Attack aircraft